Collix hirtivena is a moth in the  family Geometridae. It is found in New Guinea. Its wings range from drab brown to rust-colored.

References

Moths described in 1906
hirtivena